Post Tower is the headquarters of the logistic company Deutsche Post DHL with the two brands postal services for Germany Deutsche Post and the worldwide logistics company DHL. The Post Tower is a 162.5-metre, 41-storey office building in Bonn, Germany. It was designed by German-American architect Helmut Jahn and won the 2002 Silver Emporis Skyscraper Award.

It is the fourteenth tallest skyscraper in Germany, and the tallest in Germany outside of Frankfurt am Main.

Building details 
The building is located at the river Rhine and in the center of the old parliament area of Bonn near the Deutsche Welle and has about 55,000 m² office surface. Construction phase was May 2000 to December 2002, 80,000 m³ of concrete and 16,000 tons of structural steel were used in the building shell. The building dimensions are; height: 162.5 m, width: 41.0 m, length: 81.1 m (with ring walls 86.55 m), weight: 300,000 t. The building has the ground floor, 40 upper floors and 5 underground levels. The Tower has a surface area of 7,000 m². The Tower is constructed as a steel-glass-building. The base of the Post Tower has the shape of two staggered semi-ellipses of two shifted circle segments. Most office walls, doors and the floors of skygardens and elevators are therefore made of 93,000 m² glass used.

Climate control concept 
A double skin glass façade with about 1.2 m cavity between the external skin and the primary façade, provides natural ventilation regulated by venetian blinds. The north-facing windows at the front are smooth, the glass windows on the south-facing façade are gently sloping to allow a better flow of air (see picture). Via a decentralized underground convector, the external air is sucked in from the space between the façades, then it is conditioned and fed back into the offices. The air also reaches internal areas of the building through doors and corridors.

The office air is filtered into the Sky Gardens, warms up those areas and then is filtered back outside via façade flaps on the east and west sides of the Sky Gardens. The double skin façade enables huge energy savings.

The benefits gained by the Post Tower in using up to 130 liters of groundwater per second to heat and cool the concrete core. The remaining energy requirement is covered by connection to the district heating system, refrigerating equipment and heat pumps.

References

Deutsche Post
Buildings and structures in Bonn
2002 establishments in Germany
Skyscraper office buildings in Germany
Helmut Jahn buildings
Office buildings completed in 2002